Jeevana Teeralu is a 1977 Telugu-language film directed by G. C. Sekhar and produced by A. Gopala Krishna Reddy. The film stars Krishnam Raju, Vanisri, Jayasudha, Sivaji Ganesan and Jaggayya. The film had musical score by K. Chakravarthy. It is a remake of 1959 Bollywood film Dhool Ka Phool directed by Yash Chopra. The film was dubbed and released in Tamil as Vaazhkai Alaigal.

Cast
Krishnam Raju as Ramesh
Vanisri as Meena
Jayasudha as Ramesh's wife
Sivaji Ganesan as Nagulu (dubbed by Jaggayya) (cameo appearance)
Kanta Rao as Ramesh's father
Jaggayya as Meena's husband
Gummadi
Rao Gopal Rao as Raja Gopalam
Mohan Babu as Pottu Raju
Raavi Kondala Rao as Meena's paternal uncle
Sakshi Ranga Rao as general store owner
Sarathi
Nirmalamma as ayah

Soundtrack

References

External links

 

1977 films
Indian romantic drama films
Films scored by K. Chakravarthy
Telugu remakes of Hindi films
1970s Telugu-language films
1977 romantic drama films